Windsor is a census-designated place (CDP) comprising the main settlement within the town of Windsor, Windsor County, Vermont, United States. The population of the CDP was 2,066 at the 2010 census, compared with 3,553 for the town as a whole.

Geography
It is located along the Connecticut River, which forms the state boundary with New Hampshire.

U.S. Route 5 runs north-south through the village, connecting White River Junction to the north with Springfield and Bellows Falls to the south. Vermont Route 44 (Union Street) runs west from the center of the village towards Brownsville and South Reading. Interstate 91 passes west of the village but does not serve it directly; the closest access is Exit 9 in Hartland. The Cornish–Windsor Covered Bridge, one of the longest covered bridges in the world, crosses the Connecticut River from Windsor into Cornish, New Hampshire.

References

Census-designated places in Vermont
CDP
Census-designated places in Windsor County, Vermont